Very Big Very Soon is a 1991 British sitcom starring Paul Shane as Harry James, an actor's agent. Other characters include his assistant Ernie Chester (played by Tim Wylton), Beattie, Harry's romantic interest, played by Kate David.

Only six episodes were produced.

Cast
 Paul Shane as Harry James
 Tim Wylton as Ernie Chester
 Kate David as Beattie
 Sheila White as Avril
 Shaun Curry as Vic
 Andrew MacLean as Matthew Kite

External links 
 
 

1991 British television series debuts
1991 British television series endings
1990s British sitcoms
ITV sitcoms
Television series by ITV Studios
English-language television shows
Television shows produced by Central Independent Television
Television shows set in Derbyshire